The bronze sprite (Arielulus circumdatus), also known as the black-gilded pipistrelle, is a species of vesper bat found in China, India, Myanmar, and Nepal.

Taxonomy
The bronze sprite was described as a new species in 1840 by Dutch zoologist Coenraad Jacob Temminck, who placed it in the genus Vespertilio with a scientific name of Vespertilio circumdatus.

Description
The fur of its back is black with some hairs tipped in orange. Its belly fur is paler than its back and brown.

Range and habitat
The bronze sprite is found in South and Southeast Asia, including the following countries: Cambodia, China, India, Indonesia, Malaysia, Myanmar, Nepal, Thailand, and Vietnam.

Conservation
As of 2019, the bronze sprite is evaluated as a least-concern species by the IUCN. It meets the criteria for this designation due to its large geographic range, and thus, presumably large population. Additionally, it is not thought to be experiencing rapid population decline.

References

Arielulus
Taxa named by Coenraad Jacob Temminck
Mammals described in 1840
Mammals of Nepal
Bats of Asia
Taxonomy articles created by Polbot